Rosewood is an album led by trumpter Woody Shaw which was recorded in 1977 and released on the Columbia label in 1978.

Reception

Scott Yanow of Allmusic stated, "Woody Shaw's first album for a major label, Rosewood features the trumpeter with a sextet... Rosewood was a consensus Jazz Album Of The Year in 1977. This modal music ranks with his best work".

The album resulted in Shaw receiving many accolades including nominations as Talent Deserving Wider Recognition in Down Beat's International Jazz Critics Poll (1977), as well as Jazz Album of the Year and Best Trumpeter in Down Beat's Readers Poll (1978). Rosewood also received two Grammy Award Nominations for Best Jazz Instrumental Performance (Soloist) and Best Jazz Instrumental Performance (Group) (1979).

Track listing 
All compositions by Woody Shaw except as indicated
 "Rosewood" - 7:11
 "Everytime I See You" (Onaje Allan Gumbs) - 7:14
 "The Legend of the Cheops" (Victor Lewis) - 6:03
 "Rahsaan's Run" - 5:10
 "Sunshowers" (Clint Houston) - 7:48
 "Theme for Maxine" - 7:15
 "Isabel, the Liberator" (Larry Willis) - 8:27 Bonus track on CD reissue
 "Joshua C." - 7:09 Bonus track on CD reissue
 "Why?" (Lewis) - 4:50 Bonus track on CD reissue  
Rosewood was reissued on Woody Shaw: The Complete Columbia Albums Collection in 2011.

Personnel 
Woody Shaw - trumpet (track 1-5 & 7-9) Flugelhorn (track 6)
Carter Jefferson - tenor saxophone, soprano saxophone (tracks 1-5 & 7-9)
Joe Henderson - tenor saxophone (tracks 1-3 & 5-6)
Frank Wess - flute, piccolo flute  (tracks 1-3 & 5)
Art Webb - flute  (tracks 1-3 & 5)
James Vass - soprano saxophone, alto saxophone  (tracks 1-3 & 5)
Steve Turre - trombone, bass trombone (tracks 1-3 & 5)
Janice Robinson - trombone  (tracks 1-3 & 5)
Onaje Allan Gumbs - piano, electric piano
Clint Houston - bass
Victor Lewis - drums
Sammy Figueroa - congas (tracks 1 & 3)
Armen Halburian - percussion (tracks 1-3 & 5)
Lois Colin - harp (track 1 & 3)

References 

Woody Shaw albums
1978 albums
Columbia Records albums
Albums produced by Michael Cuscuna